Sir John Christopher Calthorpe Blofeld  (born 11 July 1932) is an English barrister and former High Court judge.

Biography
Blofeld was born at Hoveton Home Farm in Norfolk.  His father was at Eton with Ian Fleming and his surname is believed to have been the inspiration for the name of James Bond supervillain, Ernst Stavro Blofeld.  He is the elder brother of cricket commentator Henry Blofeld.  He is a distant relative of the cricketer Hon. Freddie Calthorpe and not his nephew as previously suggested; his son is Tom Blofeld.

He was educated at Sunningdale School, Eton, and King's College, Cambridge. In 1961 he married Judith A.H. Mitchell (1932–2013), and they lived at Hoveton House, Hoveton.

Blofeld played cricket for Norfolk against the Kent Second XI in the Minor Counties Championship in 1957.

Career
He was a High Court judge from 1990 to 2001, assigned to the Queen's Bench Division.  In 2000, he was one of the appeal judges to release the M25 Three.  He was Master of the Mercers' Company in 2003.

Motto

References

1932 births
Living people
People educated at Eton College
Alumni of King's College, Cambridge
Queen's Bench Division judges
People from Hoveton
Norfolk cricketers
English cricketers
Knights Bachelor
Deputy Lieutenants of Norfolk
Sportspeople from Norfolk
English King's Counsel
20th-century King's Counsel
20th-century English judges
People educated at Sunningdale School